The Imperial Secretariat Service (commonly abbreviated as the ISS) was a civil service of the British Empire in British India during British rule in the period between 1919 and 1945. The members served in the 5 central departments (1924 to 1934) and then later expanded to 10 central departments at that time, Secretariat of the Viceroy's Executive Council and later Cabinet Secretariat and Central Secretariat.

The service was one of the "Imperial Services" with the Imperial Civil Service, Indian Imperial Police, and Imperial Forest Service of the Indian Government under the British colonial rule in India.

This service still continues in the contemporary Civil Services of India, Central Superior Services of Pakistan and Bangladesh Civil Service, though these are now organised differently post-independence. It is an earliest organised civil service.

Civil Service

History
The role of the service was ensuring of the continuity of administration in the Central Secretariat called as the “Administration of the Secretariat and House Keeping”.

In the year 1919, the Imperial Secretariat Service came into being as one of the offshoots of the Lewllyn-Smith Committee which had been set up on the eve of the introduction of the Montagu–Chelmsford Reforms. As per Report of Government of India Secretariat Procedure Committee 1919, the general status of this service was recognised as equivalent to that of Provincial Civil Service (PCS) and that all members treated as gazetted officers.

The posts of Assistant, Assistant Secretary, Under Secretary were filled by officers drawn from the Imperial Secretariat Service during the British Raj.

In 1946, after India gained independence from Britain, the Imperial Secretariat Service was replaced by Central Secretariat Service in India. However, in Pakistan, a  Central Secretariat Service was formed in Central Superior Services of Pakistan, which was later replaced and renamed to Office Management Group (OMG) and Secretariat Group (SG).

Recruitment
The recruitment of the members was made by Central Staff Selection Board, which was precursor of the Union Public Service Commission set up in 1926. As per Report of Government of India Secretariat Procedure Committee 1919, it was suggested that Staff Selection Board should recruit from the main sections of the community namely Hindus, Muslims, Europeans and Anglo-Indian.

All candidates chosen by examination were given probation for a year before their appointment in the Secretariat by a definite certificate of confirmation by the Secretary in the Department.

Salary and posts
 Central Government
 Under Secretary to Government of India
 Assistant Secretary to Government of India
 Assistant

References

Indian Civil Service